Zeero is a Tru64 UNIX command/utility that zeros out disks prior to rewrite.

Purpose
 It is a more efficient way of writing zeros to a disk (device file) than using /dev/zero with dd.
 It is a way of data erasure -- removing sensitive data from a disk, or disk partition.
 shred would be more secure, but is not installed by default on Tru64 systems.

References

Data erasure software